Carlos Filipe Teixeira Moreira (born 8 December 1999) known as Kalika, is a Portuguese footballer who plays as a midfielder.

Club career
He made his LigaPro debut for Penafiel on 19 May 2019 in a game against Leixões.

References

External links

1999 births
Living people
People from Paredes, Portugal
Portuguese footballers
Association football midfielders
Liga Portugal 2 players
F.C. Penafiel players
A.C. Marinhense players
Sportspeople from Porto District